Albert C. Haft (November 13, 1886 - 10 November 1976) was a wrestler (both professional and amateur), wrestling and boxing promoter and wrestling trainer who was a prominent promoter in the United States from the late 1910s until the 1960s, running his operations primarily from Columbus, Ohio. He founded the Midwest Wrestling Alliance and was one of the founding members of the National Wrestling Alliance in 1948.

Haft's was originally the manager and booker of John Pesek, who would go on to become World Heavyweight Champion. He was also involved in amateur wrestling and was the head wrestling coach at the Ohio State University, leading "The Buckeyes" to their first team title in 1923. He also holds the Ohio State Second-Year Coaching Record to this day.

Career

Professional wrestling in-ring career (1917-19)
In his early life, Haft was an in-ring competitor in professional wrestling, entering the ring in 1917 and competing under the ring name Young Gotch. He competed sporadically until 1932 but his full-time focus as an in-ring performer was short lived, deciding instead to focus on his growing success as a promoter.

The Midwest Wrestling Association and John Pesek (1920s and 1930s)
Haft began wrestling promoting in 1919. His interest in joining the professional ranks was sparked after he met John Pesek, a fellow wrestler who Haft considered the best in the world. Haft became Pesek's manager and brokered deals for him throughout the United States and abroad. In 1929, Haft sent Pesek for a wrestling tour of Australia where he came out victorious. He returned to the United States a star and soon entered the discussion of World Heavyweight Championship contenders. With Haft by his side, Pesek became the World Heavyweight Champion. In 1931, Haft created the Midwest Wrestling Association and booked a match pitting Pesek against Joe Stecher to crown the initial champion. The bout was backed by the Ohio State Athletic Commission.  Pesek beat Stecher and Haft’s working relationship with Kansas and Missouri territories expanded Pesek’s star-power and booking potential.

Haft's Acre (1927)
An outdoor arena, Haft opened Haft's Acre at the southwest corner of Park Street and Goodale Boulevard in 1927 in Columbus. Boxing and wrestling were staged there until the early 1960s. Wrestlers such as Gorgeous George, Nature Boy Buddy Rogers and Wild Bull Curry all competed at the Haft events.

Founding of the National Wrestling Alliance (1948)
In 1948 Haft jointed four fellow, prominent wrestling promoters (including Pinkie George to form the National Wrestling Alliance. In September of the same year, Pinkie George was the first NWA President and Haft was elected the Vice President. The newly formed outfit was to operate talent exchanges, establish a territorial system and recognise one world champion per weight class. The NWA soon grew to become the largest body in professional wrestling, with recognised territories throughout the United States, Canada, Mexico and Japan.

Haft's MWA World Heavyweight Champion Orville Brown defeated Otto Kuss in a match soon thereafter and was crowned the inaugural NWA World Heavyweight Champion, merging the MWA with the NWA. Towards the end of November 1949, Brown suffered injuries in an automobile accident and the promoters of the NWA met in St. Louis to recognize Lou Thesz as the World Heavyweight Champion. During this, George and Haft were also re-elected to their positions of President and Vice President. 
The organization remained the largest governing body in the sport until the mid-1980s national expansion of Vince McMahon's World Wrestling Federation. By that time, Haft had long since retired from the business.

References

1886 births
1976 deaths
Professional wrestling promoters
Boxing promoters
Professional wrestling trainers